The United States is the world's largest exporter of turkey and related products. Nearly 361,884 metric tons (MT) of turkey meat have been exported in 2012. In comparison with 2011, the industry had experienced 14% growth. In 2013, the turkey products were valued at nearly $678.9 million, a 13% increase from 2012.

The dominant market for U.S. turkey meat is Mexico. It has been purchasing meat valued at nearly $372.6 million and accounting for 55% of turkey exports. The second-largest market for U.S. turkey, purchasing more than $70.5 million of meat, is China. Canada and Hong Kong were other significant markets for U.S. turkey meat. (FAS 2012)

The United States imports a notably small percentage of turkey meat ($31.8 million in 2012), mostly from Chile and Canada. (FAS 2012)

This is a list of turkey meat producing companies in the United States:

Butterball, LLC

Butterball is a brand of turkey and other poultry products produced by Butterball LLC.  The company manufactures food products in the United States and internationally — specializing in turkey, cured deli meats, raw roasts, and specialty products such as soups and salads, sandwiches, and entrées.

Butterball LLC was a joint venture of Smithfield Foods and Maxwell Farms Inc., an affiliate of the Goldsboro Milling Co. Seaboard Corporation bought Smithfield's stake in Butterball in 2010. The company sells over one billion pounds of turkey a year. Though the Butterball brand has been formally recognized since 1940, Butterball LLC was formed in 2006.

The company, located southeast of Raleigh, North Carolina, in Mount Olive, North Carolina, on the Wayne and Duplin County line, subsequently renamed itself Butterball LLC.

In Canada, the rights to Butterball are owned by Exceldor Foods.

Cargill Value Added Meats

Cargill has a long, rich heritage, starting with W. W. Cargill's first grain storage facility on the American frontier in 1865. The company has grown to become one of the largest privately owned businesses, providing food, agricultural, risk management, financial, and industrial products and services around the globe. It has employees in 68 countries.

Mary Thompson was tapped to lead the company's European poultry business as president of Cargill Value Added Meats. The headquarters are located in Wichita, Kansas.

Cooper Farms

Cooper Farms was founded by Virgil Cooper. He made his start in the turkey business in 1938 in downtown Oakwood, Ohio through growing around 500 meat turkeys, mainly for the holidays. Cooper Farms is one of the largest family-owned turkey producers in the U.S. James R. Cooper  is the president of the company.

Dakota Provisions

Dakota Provisions was set up by Dakota Turkey Growers, a major farmers' cooperative of 44 independent Hutterite (a religious group similar to the Amish who have adopted modern manufacturing as a way to survive) turkey farmers in North Dakota, South Dakota, and Minnesota. It  is a state-of-the-art turkey processing facility and the first full-line turkey facility to be built in the US since the late 1980s. Jordan Woodbury is the president of Dakota Provisions.

It was designed to process more than 8 million turkeys per year, more than 320 million pounds of live weight annually.

Farbest Foods, Inc.

Farbest Foods is one of the largest turkey companies in the United States and a respected leader in the industry. Farbest Foods’ processing plants are in Huntingburg and Vincennes, Indiana. Using more than 400,000 square feet in two processing plants and two distribution centers, Farbest Foods processes nearly 15 million live turkeys each year. It co-operates with domestic and foreign markets, shipping up to two million pounds of fresh and frozen turkey products every day. Ted J. Seger is at the head of the company.

Foster Farms

Foster Farms is an American poultry company. The company has been privately owned and operated by the Foster family since 1939. The company is based in Livingston, California, with operations throughout the West Coast and a few on the East Coast. The company specializes in a variety of chicken and turkey products advertised as fresh and naturally locally grown. Today, Max and Verda's grandson, Ron Foster, is the company's CEO. He  worked with his grandfather for 23 years and now oversees Foster Farms' more than 10,000 employees.

Hain Pure Protein Corp.

The company was founded in 1929 and is based in Fredericksburg, Pennsylvania. Hain Pure Protein Corporation owns and operates poultry processing facilities with Joseph A. DePippo at the head. Hain Pure Protein Corporation is a leader in growing natural, antibiotic-free poultry produced under well-known brands that include FreeBird and Epicurean Farms.

House of Raeford Farms, Inc.

House of Raeford Farms, Inc. is a family-owned, fully integrated poultry company with processing facilities located throughout the southeastern United States. Robert B. Johnson  serves as CEO and president of House of Raeford Farms, Inc.

Headquartered in Rose Hill, North Carolina, company operates poultry grow out operations and processing facilities in four southeastern states.

Jaindl Turkey Sales, Inc.

Jaindl Turkey Farms is the largest independent agricultural operation in the Lehigh Valley, located in Orefield, Pennsylvania. The company produces about 750,000 turkeys each year. David M. Jaindl is the owner and president of Jaindl Farms.

Jennie-O Turkey Store

Jennie-O Turkey Store is a brand name of turkey products. It is now a subsidiary of the Hormel Foods Corporation in Willmar, Minnesota.

The company was founded by Earl B. Olson in 1940, when he began raising turkeys.  In 1949, he bought the former Farmers Produce Company of Willmar and its turkey-processing plant.  In 1953, it was renamed to Jennie-O after his daughter, Jennifer Olson.

Jennie-O has a total of six company locations, five of which are in Minnesota and one in Wisconsin.  The Minnesota locations include Willmar/Spicer, Faribault, Montevideo, Pelican Rapids, and Melrose.  The only Wisconsin plant is found in Barron.

Koch’s Turkey Farm

Roscoe and Emma Koch first started raising turkeys on the family farm in 1939. The Koch's Turkey Farm was founded by their son Lowell and his wife Elizabeth in 1953. The farm is based in the Lewistown Valley outside of Tamaqua, Pennsylvania. Brock C. Stein, representative of the fourth generation of the Koch family, runs Koch's Turkey. Koch's has been one of the first to grow antibiotic-free turkeys with an all-vegetarian diet. The farms raise over 800,000 turkeys annually.

Kraft Foods, Inc./Oscar Mayer

The Oscar Mayer Company is an American meat and cold cut production company, owned by Kraft Foods. They entered the turkey business by purchasing Louis Rich and Co. in the early 1980s.

Norbest, Inc. (Moroni Feed Company)

Norbest is a federated marketing cooperative dealing exclusively with turkeys and value-added turkey products. It is the oldest cooperative organization of its type in the world, and is one of the top turkey-marketing firms in the United States. Norbest products are sold throughout the United States and Pacific Rim countries, Mexico, the Caribbean, and the Middle East. Membership in the Norbest cooperative has changed a few times over the 69 years of its existence, as local farmer co-ops have merged, dissolved, or changed focus. Today, the members of the Norbest, Inc. cooperative are Moroni Feed Company in central Utah.

Northern Pride Turkey

Northern Pride, Inc is a grower-owned turkey processing facility located in Thief River Falls, Minnesota. The cooperative was formed in 1989 by independent turkey growers throughout northern Minnesota and North Dakota.  Northern Pride, Inc. processes around 40 million live pounds of turkey annually. In an average processing day, Northern Pride processes around 20,000 turkeys per day. Turkeys and turkey products produced by Northern Pride are sold and distributed to customers across the U.S. and several foreign countries.

Perdue Farms, Inc.

Perdue Farms is the parent company of Perdue Foods and Perdue AgriBusiness, based in Salisbury, Maryland.  Perdue Foods is a major chicken-, turkey-, and pork-processing company in the United States.  Perdue AgriBusiness ranks among the top United States grain companies.  Perdue Farms has annual sales in excess of $6 billion.  The company was founded in 1920 by Arthur Perdue with his wife, Pearl Perdue, who had been keeping a small flock of chickens.

Now, it is leading poultry producer in the northeast United States and the second-largest across the nation, and Perdue Farms Inc. sells chicken and turkey products through retail venues and to foodservice companies in the United States and in more than 30 countries worldwide.

James A. Perdue has been the chairman of Perdue Farms since 1991 and serves as its CEO.

Prestage Farms

Today, Prestage Farms and its affiliates produce in excess of one billion pounds of turkey and pork annually.  The company employs some 1,800 associates and contracts with over 400 farm families.

Virginia Poultry Growers Cooperative, Inc. (VPGC)

VPGC was incorporated in the summer of 2004. However, the farmers who make up the cooperative have been growing turkeys for decades.

West Liberty Foods, LLC

West Liberty Foods, LLC is an American meat-processing company owned by the Iowa Turkey Growers Cooperative and formed in 1996 by a group of Iowa turkey growers, and now owns four meat processing plants.  The company mainly produces products for customers to sell under their own brand names. As of 2006, West liberty Foods was the 12th-largest turkey company in the United States.

Zacky Farms LLC

Zacky Farms LLC is an American food-production company in California. It was incorporated in 1955 by Sam Zacky's family and developed by his three sons—Harry, Al, and Bob—from retail to wholesale. Its primary factory is located in Central California.

Top turkey processors, 2015
Liveweight Processed (Million Pounds)*

Former turkey meat producing companies
Hart's Turkey Farm, Meredith, New Hampshire

References

Brand name poultry meats
Meat processing in the United States
Poultry companies
Turkey
Agriculture companies of the United States